An integrated device manufacturer (IDM) is a semiconductor company which designs, manufactures, and sells integrated circuit (IC) products.

IDM is often used to refer to a company which handles semiconductor manufacturing in-house, compared to a fabless semiconductor company, which outsources production to a third-party semiconductor fabrication plant.

Examples of IDMs are Intel, Samsung, and Texas Instruments, examples of fabless companies are AMD, Nvidia, and Qualcomm, and examples of pure play foundries are GlobalFoundries, TSMC, and UMC.

Due to the dynamic nature of the semiconductor industry, the term IDM has become less accurate than when it was coined.

OSATs
The term OSATs means "outsourced semiconductor assembly and test providers". OSATs have dominated IC packaging and testing.

Fabless operations

The terms fabless (fabrication-less), foundry, and IDM are now used to describe the role a company has in a business relationship. For example, Freescale owns and operates fabrication facilities (fab) where it manufactures many chip product lines, as a traditional IDM would. Yet it is known to contract with merchant foundries for other products, as would fabless companies.

Manufacturers
Many electronic manufacturing companies engage in business that would qualify them as an IDM:

 Analog Devices
 ams AG
 Belling
 Changxin Memory Technologies
 Cypress Semiconductor
 CR Microelectronics
 Fujitsu
 Good-Ark Electronics
 Hitachi
 IBM
 IM Flash Technologies
 Infineon
 Intersil
 Intel
 LSI Corporation
 Matsushita
 Maxim Integrated Products
 Micron Technology
 Mitsubishi
 National Semiconductor
 Nexperia
 NXP (formerly Philips + Freescale Semiconductors)
 OMMIC
 ON Semiconductor
 Pericom
 Qorvo
 Renesas (formerly NEC semiconductor)
 Samsung
 SK Hynix
 STMicroelectronics
 Sony
 Texas Instruments
 Tsinghua Unigroup
 Toshiba

Reading 
 Understanding fabless IC technology By Jeorge S. Hurtarte, Evert A. Wolsheimer, Lisa M. Tafoya 1.4.1 Integrated device manufacturer Page 8

References

Semiconductor device fabrication